Margaret Mattson was one of two women tried and acquitted in Philadelphia in the Province of Pennsylvania for witchcraft in 1683.

Biography
Nils and Margaret Mattson arrived in the colony of New Sweden in present-day southeastern Pennsylvania on May 22, 1654, on the ship Orn. They settled on land near Eddystone, Pennsylvania.

Of Swedish-Finnish descent, Nils was a reputed healer working from Finnish tradition. In 1683, some of Margaret's neighbors claimed that she had bewitched cattle.

Charges of practicing witchcraft were brought before the Pennsylvania Provincial Council on February 7, 1683 (under Julian calendar). This occurred nineteen years after the Swedish territory became a British common law colony and subject to English Witchcraft Act 1604.

Accused by several neighbors, as well as her own daughter in law, Mattson's alleged crimes included making threats against neighbors, causing cows to give little milk, bewitching and killing livestock and appearing to witnesses in spectral form. On February 27, 1683, charges against Mattson and a neighbor Gertro (a.k.a. Yeshro) Jacobsson, wife of Hendrick Jacobsson, were brought by the Attorney General before a grand jury of 21 men overseen by the colony's proprietor, William Penn. The grand jury returned a true bill indictment that afternoon, and the cases proceeded to trial. A petit jury of 12 men was selected by Penn and an interpreter was appointed for the Finnish women, who did not speak English. Penn barred the use of prosecution and defense lawyers, conducted the questioning himself, and permitted the introduction of unsubstantiated hearsay. Penn himself gave the closing charge and directions to the jury, but what he told them was not transcribed. According to the minutes of the Provincial Council, dated February 27, 1683, the jury returned with a verdict of "Guilty of having the Comon Fame of a Witch, but not Guilty in manner and Forme as Shee stands Endicted."

Thus Mattson was found guilty of having the reputation of a witch, but not guilty of bewitching animals. Neither woman was convicted of witchcraft. "Hence the superstitious got enough to have their thinking affirmed. Those less superstitious, and justice minded, got what they wanted." The accused were released on their husbands posting recognizance bonds of 50 pounds and promising six months' good behavior.

A popular legend tells of William Penn dismissing the charges against Mattson by affirming her legal right to fly on a broomstick, saying "Well, I know of no law against it." The record fails to show any such commentary, but the story probably reflects popular views of Penn's socially progressive Quaker values.

References

Other sources
Jordan, John W. A History of Delaware County, Pennsylvania.  (Lewis Historical Publishing Company, New York. 1914)
Benson, Adolph B. and Naboth Hedin, eds. Swedes in America, 1638–1938 (The Swedish American Tercentenary Association. New Haven, CT: Yale University Press. 1938)

External links
Minutes of the Provincial Council of Pennsylvania
Watson's Annals of Philadelphia and Pennsylvania
Early Witch Trial in Pennsylvania
The Fame Of A Witch

Year of birth missing
Year of death missing
People from Eddystone, Pennsylvania
17th-century women
American people of Finnish descent
American people of Swedish descent
Colonial American women
People accused of witchcraft
People of New Sweden
Cunning folk
1680s in Pennsylvania
People of colonial Pennsylvania
People acquitted of witchcraft
1697 in Europe
1697 in law
17th-century trials